Anton Municipality is located in Sofia Province, Bulgaria. The administrative centre is in Anton, Bulgaria.

Demography

Religion
According to the latest Bulgarian census of 2011, the religious composition, among those who answered the optional question on religious identification, was the following:

References

External links
 Anton municipality website 

Municipalities in Sofia Province